The Pictet Group, known as Pictet, is a Swiss multinational private bank and financial services company founded in Switzerland. Headquartered in Geneva, it is one of the largest Swiss banks and primarily offers services in wealth management, asset management, and asset servicing, to private clients and institutions.

The Pictet Group employs around 5,000 people, including 900 investment managers. It has a network of 30 offices in financial services centres, including registered banks in Geneva, Luxembourg, Nassau, Hong Kong and Singapore.

Pictet does not engage in investment banking, nor does it extend commercial loans. According to its 2021 Annual Review, Pictet had CHF 698 Bn of assets under management or custody, with its total capital ratio significantly exceeding the levels demanded by Swiss regulators. Banque Pictet & Cie SA is rated Prime-1/Aa2 by Moody's, and F1+/AA- by Fitch.

History 

Pictet traces its origin to the foundation of Banque De Candolle Mallet & Cie in Geneva on 23 July 1805. On that day, Jacob-Michel-François de Candolle and Jacques-Henry Mallet signed, with three limited partners, a Scripte de Société (memorandum of association) to form a partnership. Like all Geneva banks at the time, it started out trading in goods, but soon abandoned trading to concentrate on assisting clients in their financial and commercial business and  advising them on managing their wealth. By the 1830s, it held a broad range of securities on behalf of clients, to diversify their risks.

On the death of de Candolle in 1841, his wife’s nephew Edouard Pictet joined the partnership, and the name Pictet has remained with the bank ever since. Between 1890 and 1929, the Bank went through a period of substantial growth, the number of employees rising from 12 to more than 80 over 30 years. Although the Pictet family had been intimately engaged with the bank since the mid 19th century, it was only in 1926 that the company changed its name to Pictet & Cie.

After a period of relative stagnation marked by the Great Depression of the 1930s and the Second World War, Pictet began to expand in the 1950s as the Western world entered a prolonged period of prosperity and economic growth. In the late 1960s, the Bank embarked on the new business of institutional asset management, which has since grown to account for around half its total assets under management. In 1974, it opened an office in Montreal, the first of its current network of 28 offices around the world. Its workforce of 70 staff in 1950 rose to 300 by 1980.

As of 2011, Pictet was  Switzerland’s third largest wealth management company, and also one of Europe’s largest banks in private hands

In 2014, Pictet changed its legal structure from a simple partnership to become a corporate partnership (société en commandite par actions), which acts as a holding company for its global business. Pictet did not publish its annual results during its 209 years as a simple partnership, then published annual results for the first time upon becoming a corporate partnership. This enabled the company to manage its businesses in an international environment, and also allows the eight partners who are owner-managers of Pictet to preserve the rules of succession, which have remained unchanged for more than 200 years. Under those rules, ownership cannot be passed down to partners’ children: it is a temporary status which ends once a partner has retired. Partners hand over ownership of Pictet in batches every five to 10 years so that there are always partners from three generations connected to the family, to avoid problems that can arise with generational change. To date, there have been only 45 partners.

Pictet operates by assigning business activities and key functions like human resources, risk control and legal affairs to different partners. Small committees supervise the various corporate activities so that no single partner is solely responsible for an entire area. Pictet Group’s senior partner, who is the most senior partner at the time of appointment, has oversight for areas concerning central corporate functions, such as HR, auditing, risk and compliance. As primus inter pares, he chairs the partners meetings and represents Pictet inside and outside the bank.

Structure

Wealth management
Pictet Wealth Management provides private banking for owners of larger fortunes and family office services for families of exceptional wealth. The services include dedicated asset management, advice on strategy and investment selection, execution in global markets, safeguarding client assets and continuous monitoring. For hedge funds, private equity and real estate investments, Pictet Alternative Advisors, an independent unit, selects third-party investment managers to construct alternative investment portfolios for investors. Pictet Investment Office, is a special unit within Pictet that only looks after the wealthiest and most sophisticated clients of the bank and invest their assets into liquid and illiquid opportunities, in public and private markets following a high risk/return strategy across the capital structure.

Operating out of 22 Pictet offices worldwide, Pictet Wealth Management had CHF 274 bn of assets under management on 31 December 2021 and employed around 1100 full-time equivalent employees, including 355 private bankers. 

On 26 November 2012 it was reported that Pictet's wealth management unit was the target of a United States Department of Justice probe along with 11 other Swiss financial firms. The Department of Justice investigated banks that it suspected of aiding tax evasion. Unlike the other firms, Pictet indicated that it would not book any provisions in its 2015 accounts and that its current capital reserves were large enough to cover any potential fine.

Asset management
Pictet Asset Management manages assets for institutional investors and investment funds, including large pension funds, sovereign wealth funds and financial institutions. It also manages assets for individual investors through an extensive range of mandates, products and services. It provides clients with active and quantitative support for managing equities, fixed income, multi-asset and alternative strategies.

Since 1997, the department has been developing Socially Responsible Investments (SRI). It now manages SRI core equity portfolios for all major markets. It has also taken a thematic approach, focusing on environmental themes or sectors such as clean energy and timber that are key to the concept of sustainability.

Operating out of 18 Pictet offices worldwide, Pictet Asset Management had CHF 259 bn of assets under management on 31 December 2021 and employed around 1000 full-time equivalent employees, including 410 investment professionals.

Asset services
Pictet Asset Services provides a range of services for asset managers, pension funds and banks. These include: fund services for institutional or private investors and for independent asset managers; custody services in more than 80 countries; and round-the-clock trading across all significant asset classes by Pictet Global Markets. Fund services include setting up funds, administering them and fund governance. With eight booking centres accessing the single global platform, Pictet Asset Services had CHF 591 bn of assets in custody on 31 December 2020 and employed a little more than 1,500 full-time equivalent employees.

Prix Pictet
In 2008, Pictet launched the Prix Pictet, an award for photography highlighting societal interactions and problems. Each year, nominated photographers are invited to submit a series of pictures on a chosen theme, such as "Water" (2008) and "Space" (2017). The winner is selected by an independent jury led by Sir David King. Kofi Annan was president of the Prix Pictet from its founding in 2008 until his death in 2018.

References

Private banks
Banks established in 1805
Banks of Switzerland
Swiss companies established in 1805
Companies based in Geneva
Henokiens companies